Forever the Moment is a 2008 South Korean drama film. It is a fictionalized account of the South Korea women's handball team which competed in the 2004 Summer Olympics. The Korean title translates as "The Best Moment in Our Lives," and it is believed to be the first film that revolves around the sport of handball.

Plot 
Kim Hye-kyeong is a retired handball player who has been successfully coaching in the Japan Handball League. When the coach of South Korea's women's national team suddenly quits, she is asked to fill in, but is faced with an undisciplined squad of players. Hye-kyeong tries to improve the team by recruiting some of her old teammates, including two-time Olympic gold medalist Han Mi-sook. However, Hye-kyeong's aggressiveness causes friction amongst the players, and she is replaced by former men's handball star Ahn Seung-pil, though she decides to stay with the team as a player. Seung-pil introduces modern European training methods which brings him into conflict with the older players, and things get worse when they lose a game against a high school boys' team.

Cast 

 Moon So-ri as Han Mi-sook
 Kim Jung-eun as Kim Hye-kyeong
 Uhm Tae-woong as Ahn Seung-pil
 Kim Ji-young as Song Jeong-ran
 Jo Eun-ji as Oh Soo-hee
 Cha Min-ji as Jang Bo-ram
 Namgoong Eun-sook as  Jin-joo
 Lee Mi-do as Hyeon-ja
 Jo Yeong-jin as Director Song
 Lee Bong-gyoo as Chairman
 Jeong Seok-yong as Choong-sik, the office chief
 Ha Jung-woo as Blind date man
 Choi Wook as Coach Kang
 Jeong Se-hyeong as Trainer Jeong
 Kim Kang-mi as Dong-yoon
 Kim Jong-eon as Kim Goon
 Park Hyeong-jae as Myeong-seok
 Jo Deok-jae as Boss Bae
 Oh Chang-kyeong as Sang-yeol
 Woo Yong as Nutritionist
 Na Hyun as Director Hakiboo
 Kim Jin-hyeok as Real estate poker man
 Sung Ji-ru as Jin-gook, Jeong-ran's husband (cameo)
 Park Won-sang as Gyu-cheol, Mi-sook's husband (cameo)
 Ryu Seung-soo as Supermarket manager (cameo)

Danish and French team
 The Danish and French team players were played by real players from Danish women's handball club SK Aarhus.
 Miles Meili as Danish coach 1
 Tore Hogas as Danish coach 2
 Martin Lord Cayce as French coach
 Iwona Niedźwiedź-Cecotka as French player #3 (V. Pons)
 Mária Tóth as French player #20 (A. Olivier)

Background 

South Korea won the silver medal in women's handball at the 2004 Summer Olympics, following a close game against Denmark which was decided by a penalty shootout. The Koreans had lost a three-point lead in the second half, and at the end of normal time both sides were level at 25–25, taking the game into overtime. After the first overtime the score was still locked at 29–29, but South Korea were leading 34–33 in second overtime, until a late equaliser by Katrine Fruelund in the final ten seconds forced the game into a shootout, which Denmark won 4–2. In a poll conducted by Gallup Korea, 50.2% of respondents said that the women's handball finals was their favourite event of the 2004 Summer Olympics.

Reception 
Forever the Moment was released in South Korea on January 10, 2008. It topped the box office on its opening weekend, grossing $4,407,643, and remained at the top for a further two weeks, ahead of Hollywood films Enchanted, Sweeney Todd: The Demon Barber of Fleet Street, and Cloverfield, all released during the same period. By March 23 the film had grossed a total of $27,258,370, and as of July 13 the total number of admissions was 4,043,293.

Awards and nominations

References

External links 
  
 
 
 
 Review at Koreanfilm.org

2008 films
2000s sports drama films
South Korean sports drama films
Films about women's sports
Films about the 2004 Summer Olympics
Sports films based on actual events
Films directed by Yim Soon-rye
Best Picture Blue Dragon Film Award winners
Handball in South Korea
2000s Korean-language films
Sidus Pictures films
Myung Films films
Handball films
2008 drama films
Women's handball in South Korea
2000s South Korean films